Craig Duane Neal (born February 16, 1964) is an American basketball coach and former professional player who is currently the 
associate head coach for the Nevada Wolf Pack of the Mountain West Conference (MWC). He was selected by the Portland Trail Blazers in the third round (71st pick overall) of the 1988 NBA draft, and played in the NBA and several minor leagues.

High school
Raised in Washington, Indiana, Neal played high school basketball at Washington High School, where his father Stan was head coach. Steve Alford would later employ Neal as an assistant coach. As a senior in 1983, Neal earned all-American and all-state honors.

College playing career
In 1982, Neal signed with the Georgia Institute of Technology (Georgia Tech) to play basketball under Bobby Cremins.

Neal played for the Georgia Tech Yellow Jackets from 1983 to 1988. Due to a season-ending injury, Neal played only four games in his sophomore season in 1984–85 and took a redshirt that year. As a senior in 1987–88, Neal set the ACC single-season record with 303 assists while averaging a league-best 9.5 assists per game in addition to 7.7 points.

During Neal's time at Georgia Tech, the Yellow Jackets made the 1984 NIT and subsequent NCAA Tournaments he following four years.

Professional playing career
In the 1988 NBA draft, the Portland Trail Blazers picked Neal in the third round, 71st overall. Neal began his basketball career playing for the Jacksonville Hooters of the USBL. In his rookie NBA season, Neal played 21 games for the Portland Trail Blazers before being waived on January 11, 1989. On February 3, Neal signed as a free agent with the Miami Heat and played 32 games off the bench.

After playing in the CBA in the 1989–90 season, Neal returned to the NBA in 1990 as a free agent with the Chicago Bulls but was released before the regular season. On February 12, 1991, Neal signed with the Denver Nuggets. In 10 games, Neal averaged 12.5 minutes and 4.4 points before being waived on March 3.

Neal later played for the Florida Jades of the World Basketball League in 1991 and was the Most Valuable Player in the 1991 WBL All-Star Game.

Neal served as a player and coach for the Fort Wayne Fury of the CBA in 1994–95.

NBA scouting and coaching career
In 1996, Neal joined the Toronto Raptors of the NBA as a scout before becoming an assistant coach for the team under Lenny Wilkens in 2000. For three years, Neal coached the Raptors' summer league team and led pre-draft workouts for prospects. In the 2003–04 season, Neal was a scout and player development assistant for the Raptors.

College coaching career

Iowa
In August 2004, Craig Neal joined long-time friend and head coach Steve Alford at the University of Iowa. Iowa posted a 63-35 record while Neal was the associate-head coach, including consecutive trips to the NCAA Tournament. The Hawkeyes won 25 games in 2005-06, the second highest total in school history. They also captured the Big Ten Conference tournament title, set a school record with 10 wins over top 25 opponents and ran off a school record 18-game winning streak in Carver-Hawkeye Arena, winning all 17 home games in 2005-06.

New Mexico
On March 27, 2007, Craig Neal followed Steve Alford to New Mexico and became the associate head coach of the Lobos. In his first year at New Mexico, Craig Neal played an essential role in turning New Mexico into a competitive team. In addition, the Lobos made it into post season play in the NIT for the first time since 2005. In 2010 and 2012, New Mexico reached the NCAA tournament (winning both opening round games). In 2013, New Mexico reached the NCAA tournament as the number 3 seed, losing in the first round to 14th seed Harvard.

On April 2, 2013, New Mexico promoted Neal to head coach, after Alford left to take the head coaching position at UCLA. In Neal's first season as head coach, New Mexico finished 27–7, including 15–3 and second place in the Mountain West Conference. New Mexico beat San Diego State in the Mountain West tournament, finished the season ranked 17th in the AP Poll, and earned an automatic bid to the NCAA tournament. As a 7 seed in the tournament, New Mexico lost in the Round of 64 to 10 seed Stanford.

However, New Mexico went 15–16 the following year and 17–15 in 2015–16.  In 2016–17, New Mexico went 17–14 and marked the first time in the nearly 50-year history of The Pit that home attendance did not rank in the top 25 in Division I. By the end of the season, four players who had eligibility remaining decided to leave the program, including leading scorer Elijah Brown.

On March 31, 2017, New Mexico fired Neal 3 weeks after Lobos AD Paul Krebs announced that Neal would return next season. Acting university president Chaouki Abdallah stated: "The decision made late tonight comes after lengthy consideration in light of recent developments that cannot be ignored."

Head coaching record

Community service
Along with his basketball and coaching career, Neal founded the Craig Neal/Grant Delagrange benefit golf tournament in Fort Wayne, IN, with proceeds dedicated to schools for autistic and Down Syndrome children. In addition, while in Toronto Craig Neal was involved with the NBA's Team Up community service program.

Family
He and his wife, Janet, have two sons, Cullen and Dalton. Basketball is strong in the Neal family. Craig's younger brother Shane Neal lettered four seasons at the University of Tennessee-Chattanooga. He helped pace the Mocs to four straight Southern Conference championships and three straight berths in the NCAA Tournament. His father Stan Neal was a collegiate standout at Ball State.

References

1964 births
Living people
American expatriate basketball people in Canada
American men's basketball players
Basketball coaches from Indiana
Basketball players from Indiana
College men's basketball head coaches in the United States
Columbus Horizon players
Denver Nuggets players
Educators from Indiana
Fort Wayne Fury players
Georgia Tech Yellow Jackets men's basketball players
Iowa Hawkeyes men's basketball coaches
Miami Heat players
Nevada Wolf Pack men's basketball coaches
New Mexico Lobos men's basketball coaches
People from Washington, Indiana
Point guards
Portland Trail Blazers draft picks
Portland Trail Blazers players
Rapid City Thrillers players
Shooting guards
Sportspeople from Muncie, Indiana
Toronto Raptors assistant coaches